Ajama also known as Suq-El-Ajama or Rabu' el-A'jama) is a village in the sub-governorate of Bariq in the province of Asir, Saudi Arabia. It was the capital of The Humaydah tribe. Kinahan Cornwallis Said (1916), suq el-ajamah a large village of about 300 stone houses, former seat of a Turkish markaz and the most important market (held on Wednesday ) of the neighbourhood.

See also 

 List of cities and towns in Saudi Arabia
 Regions of Saudi Arabia

References 

Populated places in Bareq
Populated places in 'Asir Province
Populated coastal places in Saudi Arabia